The women's 100 metres hurdles event at the 1975 Summer Universiade was held at the Stadio Olimpico in Rome on 19 and 20 September.

Medalists

Results

Heats

Final
Wind: 0.0 m/s

References

Athletics at the 1975 Summer Universiade
1975